The 1998 Christchurch mayoral election was part of the New Zealand local elections of that year. Garry Moore of the centre-left Christchurch 2021 ticket was elected over thirteen other candidates, and replaced Vicki Buck as Mayor.

Results
The final results were as follows

References

Mayoral elections in Christchurch
1998 elections in New Zealand
Politics of Christchurch
October 1998 events in New Zealand
1990s in Christchurch